Anthony Alan-Williams (born 13 January 1947 in Portsmouth, England) is a British sprint canoer who competed in the mid-1970s. He was eliminated in the semifinals of the K-4 1000 m event at the 1976 Summer Olympics in Montreal.

References

External links
Sports-Reference.com profile
Olympics.org Profile 

1947 births
Sportspeople from Portsmouth
Canoeists at the 1976 Summer Olympics
Living people
Olympic canoeists of Great Britain
British male canoeists